Baey Yam Keng (born 31 August 1970) is a Singaporean politician who has been serving as Senior Parliamentary Secretary for Sustainability and the Environment since 2022 and Senior Parliamentary Secretary for Transport since 2018. A member of the governing People's Action Party (PAP), he has been the Member of Parliament (MP) representing the Tampines North division of Tampines GRC since 2011.

Before entering politics, Baey had worked in the public and corporate sectors in various organisations, including the Economic Development Board, Ministry of Trade and Industry, Ministry of Information, Communications and the Arts, National Arts Council, CapitaLand and Hill+Knowlton Strategies. He made his political debut in the 2006 general election when he joined a six-member PAP team contesting in Tanjong Pagar GRC, and they won by an uncontested walkover. Baey thus became a Member of Parliament representing the Queenstown ward of Tanjong Pagar GRC. During the 2011 general election, he switched to contesting in Tampines GRC. After the PAP team won with 57.22% of the vote, Baey became the Member of Parliament representing the Tampines North ward of Tampines GRC and had retained his parliamentary seat in the subsequent general elections. He was appointed Parliamentary Secretary at the Ministry of Culture, Community and Youth in 2015 and promoted to Senior Parliamentary Secretary in 2018.

Education 
Baey was the first batch of students at Westlake Primary School (now defunct) from 1977 to 1982. He was educated at Catholic High School and Hwa Chong Junior College before he received a scholarship from the Economic Development Board to study biotechnology at Imperial College London. He graduated with a Bachelor of Science (first class honours) in biotechnology, and received a postgraduate scholarship from the Economic Development Board to complete a Master of Science (distinction) in biochemical engineering at University College London.

Career 
Baey started his career in 1995 in the public sector and had worked at the Economic Development Board, Ministry of Trade and Industry, Ministry of Information, Communications and the Arts, and National Arts Council. In 2006, he joined the corporate sector as Vice-President (Corporate Marketing & Corporate Social Responsibility) at CapitaLand and General Manager of CapitaLand Hope Foundation. In 2009, he joined Hill+Knowlton Strategies and was its Singapore Managing Director from 2011 to 2012. In 2013, he received a Lien Fellowship from Nanyang Technological University and was an adjunct lecturer at the university from 2013 to 2015.

Political career 
Baey entered politics during the 2006 general election when he joined a six-member People's Action Party (PAP) team contesting in Tanjong Pagar GRC. The PAP team won by an uncontested walkover and Baey thus became a Member of Parliament representing the Queenstown ward of Tanjong Pagar GRC. In February 2007, Baey was named as one of the members of a 'new media capabilities group' aimed at countering online criticisms of the PAP.

During the 2011 general election, Baey switched to join the five-member PAP team contesting in Tampines GRC and they won with 57.22% of the vote against the National Solidarity Party. Baey thus became the Member of Parliament representing the Tampines North ward of Tampines GRC.

In December 2013, Baey, who is known for sharing his personal life on social media, attracted controversy when he mentioned that he paid below the full price for a meal at a food stall in Tampines North. After the stall owner clarified that he had given Baey an undisclosed discount out of goodwill, Baey publicised that the stall would offer a special discount for up to 100 customers a day from 21 to 22 December 2013, and would donate all proceeds to the Tampines North welfare fund to help needy residents. Baey also shared how an activist showed support by pledging dollar for dollar for the same fund.

In June 2014, Baey allegedly called for legal action to be taken against those who had vandalised the PAP's article on Wikipedia, which had been the subject of an edit war between vandals and editors on 12 and 13 June. He clarified later that he did not call on the PAP to consider legal action as Wikipedia page edits are not a priority for legal action.

In January 2015, Baey was co-opted into the PAP's Central Executive Committee. He left the Central Executive Committee in 2017.

During the 2015 general election, Baey contested as part of a five-member PAP team in Tampines GRC again and won with 72.07% of the vote against the National Solidarity Party, thus retaining his parliamentary seat in Tampines North. On 1 October 2015, he was appointed Parliamentary Secretary at the Ministry of Culture, Community and Youth. On 1 May 2018, he was promoted to Senior Parliamentary Secretary and appointed to the Ministry of Transport while concurrently serving at the Ministry of Culture, Community and Youth.

Baey retained his parliamentary seat in Tampines North during the 2020 general election after his five-member PAP team won with 66.41% of the vote against the National Solidarity Party. On 26 July 2020, he relinquished his appointment at the Ministry of Culture, Community and Youth but continued serving as Senior Parliamentary Secretary at the Ministry of Transport. Baey was appointed Senior Parliamentary Secretary at the Ministry of Sustainability and the Environment on 13 June 2022.

Personal life 
Baey is married to Lim Hai Yen, a playwright and director. They have three children. Baey is the founding president and producer of a theatre group, The ETCeteras. In 2014, he had a lead acting role in Like Me. I Like, a play written and directed by his wife. He was diagnosed with stage one nose cancer in 2021.

References

External links

 Baey Yam Keng on Parliament of Singapore

 

1970 births
Alumni of Imperial College London
Alumni of University College London
Catholic High School, Singapore alumni
Hwa Chong Junior College alumni
Living people
Members of the Parliament of Singapore
People's Action Party politicians
Singaporean people of Teochew descent